Jesse Eisinger is an American journalist and author. Winner of the Pulitzer Prize for National Reporting in 2011, he currently works as a senior reporter for ProPublica. His first book, The Chickenshit Club: Why the Justice Department Fails to Prosecute Executives, was published by Simon & Schuster in 2017.

Eisinger's work has appeared in ProPublica, The New York Times, The Wall Street Journal, The Atlantic, The New Yorker website, and many other publications.

Education 
Eisinger is a graduate of Columbia College, where he majored in American Studies.

Early career 
Eisinger began his career with The South Pacific Mail in Santiago, Chile. He moved to Dow Jones Newswires and then TheStreet.com, where he covered biotechnology and pharmaceuticals.

In 2000, Eisinger was hired by The Wall Street Journal Europe, where he wrote the thrice-weekly column "Heard in Europe" for two years.

While working in Europe, Eisinger helped expose frauds at Lernout & Hauspie, a Belgian company specializing in voice recognition software, and Élan, an Irish pharmaceutical company.

Financial and investigative reporting 
Eisinger moved to New York in 2002 to write for The Wall Street Journal. His first column was called "Ahead of the Tape". After two years, he started writing a new financial column called “Long and Short”.

Several years later, Eisinger joined the Conde Nast Portfolio as the magazine's Wall Street editor. His cover story in November 2007, titled “Wall Street Requiem,” predicted the collapse of Bear Stearns and Lehman Brothers.

Eisinger was hired as a senior reporter by the nonprofit investigative newsroom ProPublica in 2009.

Pulitzer Prize 
In 2009, Eisinger began work on a series of stories, “The Wall Street Money Machine,” that revealed how Wall Street's morally questionable practices had led to the worst financial crisis since the Great Depression.

Co-authored with Jake Bernstein, the series was awarded the Pulitzer Prize for National Reporting in 2011. It was the first Pulitzer Prize awarded to a group of stories published in a digital-only format.

Other awards 
Eisinger was a New America Fellow in 2016 and 2017.

Eisinger's Wall Street series was also nominated for the 2011 Goldsmith Prize for Investigative Reporting. He would be nominated again for the Goldsmith in 2015 for a series of stories about the Red Cross, written with Justin Elliott of ProPublica and NPR’s Laura Sullivan.

In 2015, Eisinger was honored with the Gerald Loeb Award for his Wall Street commentary.

References

External links

Living people
American male journalists
American financial writers
Pulitzer Prize for National Reporting winners
The Wall Street Journal people
Columbia College (New York) alumni
Pulitzer Prize winners
Gerald Loeb Award winners for Columns, Commentary, and Editorials
Year of birth missing (living people)